Margaretha Geertruida MacLeod (née Zelle; 7 August 187615 October 1917), better known by the stage name Mata Hari, was a Dutch exotic dancer and courtesan who was convicted of being a spy for Germany during World War I. She was executed by firing squad in France. The idea of a beautiful exotic dancer using her powers of seduction as a spy made her name synonymous with the femme fatale. Her story has served as an inspiration for many books, films, and other works.

It has been suggested that she was convicted and condemned because the French Army needed a scapegoat, and that the files used to secure her conviction contained several falsifications. Some have even stated that Mata Hari could not have been a spy, and was innocent.

Early life
Margaretha Geertruida Zelle was born 7 August 1876 in Leeuwarden, Netherlands. She was the eldest of four children to Antje van der Meulen (1842–1891) and her husband, Adam Zelle (1840–1910). She had three younger brothers; Johannes Hendriks, Arie Anne, and Cornelis Coenraad. She was affectionately called "M'greet" by her family. Despite traditional assertions that Mata Hari was partly of Jewish, Malaysian, or Javanese, i.e., Indonesian descent, scholars conclude she had no Jewish or Asian ancestry, and both of her parents were Dutch. Her father owned a hat shop, made investments in the oil industry, and became affluent enough to give Margaretha and her siblings a lavish early childhood that included exclusive schools until the age of 13.

Soon after Margaretha's father went bankrupt in 1889, her parents divorced, and her mother died in 1891. Her father remarried in Amsterdam on 9 February 1893 to Susanna Catharina ten Hoove (1844–1913). The family fell apart, and Margaretha was sent to live with her godfather, Mr. Visser, in Sneek. Subsequently, she studied to be a kindergarten teacher in Leiden, but when the headmaster began to flirt with her conspicuously, she was removed from the institution by her godfather. A few months later, she fled to her uncle's home in The Hague.

Dutch East Indies
At 18, Margaretha answered an advertisement in a Dutch newspaper placed by Dutch Colonial Army Captain Rudolf MacLeod (1856–1928), who was living in what was then the Dutch East Indies (now Indonesia) and was looking for a wife. Margaretha married MacLeod in Amsterdam on 11 July 1895. He was the son of Captain John Brienen MacLeod (a descendant of the Gesto branch of the MacLeods of Skye, hence his Scottish surname) and Dina Louisa, Baroness Sweerts de Landas. The marriage enabled Zelle to move into the Dutch upper class and placed her finances on a sound footing. They had two children, Norman-John MacLeod (1897–1899) and Louise Jeanne MacLeod (1898–1919).

The marriage was overall a disappointment. Rudolf was an alcoholic and physically abused Margaretha, whom he blamed for his lack of promotion. He also openly kept a concubine, a socially accepted practice in the Dutch East Indies. Margaretha abandoned him temporarily, moving in with Van Rheedes, another Dutch officer. She studied Indonesian culture intensely for several months and joined a local dance company. In correspondence to her relatives in the Netherlands in 1897, she revealed her artistic name of Mata Hari, the word for "sun" in the local Malay language (literally, "eye of the day").

At Rudolf's urging, Margaretha returned to him, but his behavior did not change. She sought escape from her circumstances by studying the local culture. In 1899, their children fell violently ill from complications relating to the treatment of syphilis contracted from their parents, though the family claimed an irate servant poisoned them. Jeanne survived, but Norman died. Some sources maintain that one of Rudolf's enemies may have poisoned their supper to kill both of their children. After moving back to the Netherlands, the couple officially separated on 30 August 1902. The divorce became final in 1906, and Margaretha was awarded custody of Jeanne. Rudolf was legally required to pay child support, which he never did. Once when Jeanne visited Rudolf, he decided not to return her to her mother. Margaretha did not have the resources to fight the situation and accepted it, believing that while Rudolf had been an abusive husband, he had always been a good father. Jeanne later died at the age of 21, possibly from complications related to syphilis.

Career

Paris

In 1903, Zelle moved to Paris, where she performed as a circus horse rider using the name Lady MacLeod, much to the disapproval of the Dutch MacLeods. Struggling to earn a living, she also posed as an artist's model.

By 1904, Mata Hari rose to prominence as an exotic dancer. She was a contemporary of dancers Isadora Duncan and Ruth St. Denis, leaders in the early modern dance movement, which around the turn of the 20th century, looked to Asia and Egypt for artistic inspiration. Gabriel Astruc became her personal booking agent.

Promiscuous, flirtatious, and openly flaunting her body, Mata Hari captivated her audiences and was an overnight success from the debut of her act at the Musée Guimet on 13 March 1905. She became the long-time mistress of the millionaire industrialist Émile Étienne Guimet, who had founded the Musée. She posed as a Javanese princess of priestly Hindu birth, pretending to have been immersed in the art of sacred Indian dance since childhood. She was photographed numerous times during this period, nude or nearly so. Some of these pictures were obtained by MacLeod and strengthened his case in keeping custody of their daughter.

Mata Hari brought a carefree provocative style to the stage in her act, which garnered wide acclaim. The most celebrated segment of her act was her progressive shedding of clothing until she wore just a jeweled breastplate and some ornaments upon her arms and head. She was never seen bare-chested as she was self-conscious about having small breasts. Early in her career, she wore a bodystocking for her performances that was similar in color to her skin, but that was later omitted.

Although Mata Hari's claims about her origins were fictitious, it was common for entertainers of her era to invent colourful stories about their origins as part of the show. Her act was successful because it elevated erotic dance to a more respectable status and broke new ground in a style of entertainment for which Paris was later world-famous. Her style and free-willed attitude made her a popular woman, as did her eagerness to perform in exotic and revealing clothing. She posed for provocative photos and mingled in wealthy circles. Since most Europeans at the time were unfamiliar with the Dutch East Indies, Mata Hari was thought of as exotic, and it was assumed her claims were genuine. One enthusiastic French journalist wrote in a Paris newspaper that Mata Hari was "so feline, extremely feminine, majestically tragic, the thousand curves and movements of her body trembling in a thousand rhythms." One journalist in Vienna wrote after seeing one of her performances that Mata Hari was "slender and tall with the flexible grace of a wild animal, and with blue-black hair" and that her face "makes a strange foreign impression."

By about 1910, myriad imitators had arisen. Critics began to opine that the success and dazzling features of the popular Mata Hari were due to cheap exhibitionism and lacked artistic merit. Although she continued to schedule important social events throughout Europe, she was disdained by serious cultural institutions as a dancer who did not know how to dance.

Mata Hari's career went into decline after 1912. On 13 March 1915, she performed in the last show of her career. She had begun her career relatively late as a dancer and had started putting on weight. However, by this time, she had become a successful courtesan, known more for her sensuality and eroticism than for her classical beauty. She had relationships with high-ranking military officers, politicians, and others in influential positions in many countries. Her relationships and liaisons with powerful men frequently took her across international borders. Before World War I, she was generally viewed as an artist and a free-spirited bohemian, but as war approached, she began to be seen by some as a wanton and promiscuous woman, and perhaps a dangerous seductress.

Espionage 

During World War I, the Netherlands remained neutral. As a Dutch subject, Zelle was thus able to cross national borders freely. To avoid the battlefields, she traveled between France and the Netherlands via Spain and Britain, and her movements inevitably attracted attention. During the war, Zelle was involved in what was described as a very intense romantic-sexual relationship with Captain Vadim Maslov, a 23-year-old Russian pilot serving with the French, whom she called the love of her life. Maslov was part of the 50,000-strong Russian Expeditionary Force sent to the Western Front in the spring of 1916.

In the summer of 1916, Maslov was shot down and badly wounded during a dogfight with the Germans, losing his sight in his left eye, which led Zelle to ask for permission to visit her wounded lover at the hospital where he was staying near the front.
As a citizen of a neutral country, Zelle would not normally be allowed near the front. Zelle was met by agents from the Deuxième Bureau who told her that she would be allowed to see Maslov if she agreed to spy for France.

Before the war, Zelle had performed as Mata Hari several times before the Crown Prince Wilhelm, eldest son of Kaiser Wilhelm II and nominally a senior German general on the Western Front. The Deuxième Bureau believed she could obtain information by seducing the Crown Prince for military secrets. In fact, his involvement was minimal, and it was German government propaganda that promoted the image of the Crown Prince as a great warrior, the worthy successor to the Hohenzollern monarchs who had made Prussia strong and powerful. They wanted to avoid publicizing that the man expected to be the next Kaiser was a playboy noted for womanizing, partying, and indulging in alcohol, who spent another portion of his time associating with far right-wing politicians, with the intent to have his father declared insane and deposed.

Unaware that the Crown Prince did not have much to do with the running of Army Group Crown Prince or the 5th Army, the Deuxième Bureau offered Zelle one million francs if she could seduce him and provide France with good intelligence about German plans. The fact that the Crown Prince had, before 1914, never commanded a unit larger than a regiment, and was now supposedly commanding both an army and an army group at the same time should have been a clue that his role in German decision-making was mostly nominal. Zelle's contact with the Deuxième Bureau was Captain Georges Ladoux, who later emerged as one of her principal accusers.

In November 1916, she was traveling by steamer from Spain when her ship called at the British port of Falmouth. There she was arrested and taken to London, where she was interrogated at length by Sir Basil Thomson, assistant commissioner at New Scotland Yard in charge of counter-espionage. He gave an account of this in his 1922 book Queer People, saying that she eventually admitted to working for the Deuxième Bureau. Initially detained in Canon Row police station, she was then released and stayed at the Savoy Hotel. A full transcript of the interview is in Britain's National Archives and was broadcast, with Mata Hari played by Eleanor Bron, on the independent station LBC in 1980. It is unclear if she lied on this occasion, believing the story made her sound more intriguing, or if French authorities were using her in such a way but would not acknowledge her due to the embarrassment and international backlash it could cause.

In late 1916, Zelle travelled to Madrid, where she met with the German military attaché Major Arnold Kalle and asked if he could arrange a meeting with the Crown Prince. During this period, Zelle apparently offered to share French secrets with Germany in exchange for money, though whether this was because of greed or an attempt to set up a meeting with Crown Prince Wilhelm remains unclear.

In January 1917, Major Kalle transmitted radio messages to Berlin describing the helpful activities of a German spy code-named H-21, whose biography so closely matched Zelle's that it was obvious that Agent H-21 could only be Mata Hari. The Deuxième Bureau intercepted the messages and, from the information they contained, identified H-21 as Mata Hari. The messages were in a code that German intelligence knew had already been broken by the French, suggesting that the messages were contrived to have Zelle arrested by the French.

General Walter Nicolai, the chief IC (intelligence officer) of the German Army, had grown very annoyed that Mata Hari had provided him with no intelligence worthy of the name, instead selling the Germans mere Paris gossip about the sex lives of French politicians and generals, and decided to terminate her employment by exposing her as a German spy to the French.

Trial

In December 1916, the Second Bureau of the French War Ministry let Mata Hari obtain the names of six Belgian agents. Five were suspected of submitting fake material and working for the Germans, while the sixth was suspected of being a double agent for Germany and France. Two weeks after Mata Hari had left Paris for a trip to Madrid, the Germans executed the double agent while the five others continued their operations. This development proved to the Second Bureau that Mata Hari had communicated the names of the six spies to the Germans.

On 13 February 1917, Mata Hari was arrested in her room at the Hotel Elysée Palace on the Champs Elysées in Paris. She was tried on 24 July, accused of spying for Germany and consequently causing the deaths of at least 50,000 soldiers. Although the French and British intelligence suspected her of spying for Germany, neither could produce definite evidence against her.

Zelle's principal interrogator, who grilled her relentlessly, was Captain Pierre Bouchardon; he was later to prosecute her at trial. Bouchardon established that much of the Mata Hari persona was invented. Far from being a Javanese princess, Zelle was Dutch, which he used as evidence of her dubious and dishonest character at her trial. Zelle admitted to Bouchardon that she had accepted 20,000 francs from a German diplomat and former lover as reimbursement for belongings taken from her by German authorities. Bouchardon claimed that this was, in fact, payment to her for spying for Germany. In the meantime, Ladoux had been preparing a case against his former agent by casting all of her activities in the worst possible light, going so far as to engage in evidence tampering.

Scapegoat
In 1917, France had been badly shaken by the Great Mutinies of the French Army in the spring of 1917 following the failure of the Nivelle Offensive together with a massive strike wave. At the time, many believed France might collapse due to war exhaustion. In July 1917, a new government under Georges Clemenceau had come into power, utterly committed to winning the war. In this context, having one German spy on whom everything that went wrong with the war so far could be blamed was most convenient for the French government, making Mata Hari the perfect scapegoat, which explains why the case against her received maximum publicity in the French press and led to her importance in the war being greatly exaggerated. The Canadian historian Wesley Wark stated in a 2014 interview that Mata Hari was never an important spy and just made a scapegoat for French military failures which she had nothing to do with, stating: "They needed a scapegoat and she was a notable target for scapegoating." Likewise, the British historian Julie Wheelwright stated: "She really did not pass on anything that you couldn't find in the local newspapers in Spain." Wheelwright went on to describe Zelle as "... an independent woman, a divorcée, a citizen of a neutral country, a courtesan and a dancer, which made her a perfect scapegoat for the French, who were then losing the war. She was kind of held up as an example of what might happen if your morals were too loose."

Zelle wrote several letters to the Dutch Ambassador in Paris, claiming her innocence. "My international connections are due of my work as a dancer, nothing else .... Because I really did not spy, it is terrible that I cannot defend myself." The most terrible and heartbreaking moment for Mata Hari during the trial occurred when her lover Maslov—by now a deeply embittered man as a result of losing his eyes in combat—declined to testify for her, telling her he did not care if she was convicted or not. It was reported that Zelle fainted when she learned that Maslov had abandoned her.

Her defense counsel, veteran international lawyer , faced impossible odds; he was denied permission to cross-examine the prosecution's witnesses or to examine his witnesses directly. Bouchardon used the fact that Zelle was a woman as evidence of her guilt, saying: "Without scruples, accustomed to making use of men, she is the type of woman who is born to be a spy." Zelle has often been portrayed as a femme fatale, the dangerous, seductive woman who uses her sexuality to manipulate men effortlessly, but others view her differently: in the words of the American historians Norman Polmer and Thomas Allen she was "naïve and easily duped", a victim of men rather than a victimizer.

Although news reports following her execution claimed she had admitted to spying for Germany, Mata Hari made no such admission. She maintained throughout her ordeal that she had never been a German spy. At her trial, Zelle vehemently insisted that her sympathies were with the Allies and declared her passionate love of France, her adopted homeland. In October 2001, documents released from the archives of MI5 (British counter-intelligence) were used by a Dutch group, the Mata Hari Foundation, to ask the French government to exonerate Zelle as they argued that the MI5 files proved she was not guilty of the charges she was convicted of. A spokesperson from the Mata Hari Foundation argued that at most, Zelle was a low-level spy who provided no secrets to either side, stating: "We believe that there are sufficient doubts concerning the dossier of information that was used to convict her to warrant re-opening the case. Maybe she wasn't entirely innocent, but it seems clear she wasn't the master-spy whose information sent thousands of soldiers to their deaths, as has been claimed."

Execution

Zelle was executed by a firing squad of 12 French soldiers just before dawn on 15 October 1917. She was 41. According to an eyewitness account by British reporter Henry Wales, she was not bound and refused a blindfold. She defiantly blew a kiss to the firing squad.

A 1934 New Yorker article reported that at her execution, she wore "a neat Amazonian tailored suit, especially made for the occasion, and a pair of new white gloves", though another account indicates she wore the same suit, low-cut blouse, and tricorn hat ensemble which had been picked out by her accusers for her to wear at trial, and which was still the only full, clean outfit which she had in prison. Neither description matches photographic evidence. Wales recorded her death, saying that after the volley of shots rang out, "Slowly, inertly, she settled to her knees, her head up always, and without the slightest change of expression on her face. For the fraction of a second it seemed she tottered there, on her knees, gazing directly at those who had taken her life. Then she fell backward, bending at the waist, with her legs doubled up beneath her." A non-commissioned officer then walked up to her body, pulled out his revolver, and shot her in the head to make sure she was dead.

Remains and 2017 French declassification

Mata Hari's body was not claimed by any family members and was accordingly used for medical study. Her head was embalmed and kept in the Museum of Anatomy in Paris. In 2000, archivists discovered that it had disappeared, possibly as early as 1954, according to curator Roger Saban, during the museum's relocation. Her head remains missing. Records dated 1918 show that the museum also received the rest of the body, but none of the remains could later be accounted for.

Mata Hari's sealed trial and other related documents, a total of 1,275 pages, were declassified by the French Army in 2017, one hundred years after her execution.

Legacy

Museum exhibition

The Frisian museum (Dutch: Fries Museum) in Leeuwarden, Netherlands, contains a "Mata Hari Room". Included in the exhibit are two of her personal scrapbooks and an oriental rug embroidered with the footsteps of her fan dance. Located in Mata Hari's native town, the museum is well known for researching the life and career of Leeuwarden's world-famous citizen. The largest-ever Mata Hari exhibition was opened in the Museum of Friesland on 14 October 2017, one hundred years after her death.

Mata Hari's birthplace is located in the building at Kelders 33. The building suffered smoke and water damage during a fire in 2013 but was later restored. Architect Silvester Adema studied old drawings of the storefront to reconstruct it as it appeared when Adam Zelle, the father of Mata Hari, had a hat shop there. In 2016, an information centre (belevingscentrum) was created in the building displaying mementos of Mata Hari.

In popular culture 

The idea of an exotic dancer working as a lethal double agent using her powers of seduction to extract military secrets from her many lovers made Mata Hari an enduring archetype of the femme fatale.

Her life inspired several films, including:
 Mata Hari (1920)
 Mata Hari (1927), a German production
 Mata Hari (1931), a Hollywood motion picture starring Greta Garbo
 In the 1939 romantic comedy Cafe Society, African-American actress Lillian Yarbo portrays Mattie Harriett, hired by Allyn Joslyn's gossip columnist to spy on the film's two protagonists, Fred MacMurray and Madeleine Carroll.
 Mata Hari, Agent H21 (1964)
 In the 1967 James Bond spoof Casino Royale, Joanna Pettet played Mata Bond, said to be the daughter of James Bond and Mata Hari
 In the 1968 Spanish comedy , Mata Hari (Carmen de Lirio) retires with an accountant, and her Spanish maid Guillermina (Gracita Morales) impersonates her in an espionage imbroglio.
 In the 1970 American action comedy series Lancelot Link, Secret Chimp, a chimpanzee named "Mata Hairi" plays the role of a secret agent, with Joan Gerber serving as a voice actress.
 In the 1972 British comedy film Up the Front, Zsa Zsa Gabor portrays Mata Hari
 Mata Hari (1981), television-series
 "Mata Hari; The Magic Camera", an episode of Fantasy Island (1982)
 Mata Hari (1985)
 "Paris, October 1916", an episode of The Young Indiana Jones Chronicles. (1993) She is portrayed by Domiziana Giordano. Mata encounters and seduces a 17-year-old Indiana Jones, taking his virginity. "Paris, October 1916" was later re-edited into the second half of the film Demons of Deception.
 Mata Hari (2016)
 Mata Hari (2017), short film
 Mata Hari: The Naked Spy (2017)
 Mata Hari (2017), a 12-episode Russian-Portuguese TV series starring Vahina Giocante in the title role
 In the 2021 movie The King's Man Mata Hari is shown as one of the Shepherd's agents (alongside Gavrilo Princip and Rasputin) portrayed by Austrian actress Valerie Pachner.

Mata Hari's life also inspired at least five stage musicals:
 Mata Hari in 1967, starring Pernell Roberts and Marisa Mell
 Mata Hari, by Lene Lovich, Judge Smith, and Les Chappell, premiered in 1982 at the Lyric Theatre, Hammersmith;
 Mata!, with words and music by Stuart Brayson, received its World Premiere at Blackpool Grand Theatre in June 1995
 Mata Hari at the Moulin Rouge, by Frank Wildhorn, which debuted in Seoul, South Korea in March 2016
 One Last Night with Mata Hari, written by Craig Walker with music by John Burge, debuted at the Isabel Bader Centre for the Performing Arts, in Kingston, Ontario, in January 2017.
In 2022, its musical adaptation by director Kim Moon Jeong and performed by the South Korean singer Solar, from Mamamoo.

In 1931 Mata Hari, an American thoroughbred racehorse, was foaled. She twice won championship honors as the top filly in the sport. In 1943, when in foal to fellow champion Balladier, she produced Spy Song.

In 1977, Bally Manufacturing released an electro-mechanical pinball machine named after Mata Hari, and a Solid State version in 1978.

In 1995, Israeli singer Ofra Haza released a single titled "Mata Hari".

In February 2016, the Dutch National Ballet premiered a two-act ballet entitled Mata Hari, with Anna Tsygankova dancing the role of Mata Hari, choreography by Ted Brandsen, and music by Tarik O'Regan.

In 2017, the opera Mata Hari by librettist Peter Peers and composer Matt Marks premiered at New York's Prototype Festival. In August 2018, it was also produced by West Edge Opera, with Tina Mitchell reprising her starring role.

In 2019, English singer-songwriter Frank Turner released a song about Mata Hari, entitled "Eye of the Day", on his album No Man's Land.

In 2021, Azerbaijan participated in the Eurovision Song Contest with the song "Mata Hari", performed by Samira Efendi.

See also
 List of dancers
 Women in dance
  – sometimes known in fiction under the pseudonym "Eastern Mata Hari"

References
Citations

Bibliography

 Collas, Phillipe, (2008). Mata Hari, sa véritable Histoire. Paris: Plon 2003.  (French)
 Coulson, Thomas. Mata Hari: Courtesan and Spy. London: Hutchinson, 1930. 
 Craig, Mary, W. (2017), A Tangled Web: Mata Hari Dancer, Courtesan, Spy. Stroud: The History Press, 2017. 
 Dumarcet, Lionel: L'affaire Mata-Hari. De Vecchi, Paris 2006,  (French)
 Howe, Russel Warren: Mata-Hari. The true story. Editions de l'Archipel, Paris 2007,  (French)
 Huisman, Marijke. (1998), Mata Hari (1876–1917): de levende legende. Hilversum: Verloren.  (Dutch)
 Maucher,Ute, Pfeiffer, Gabi: Codewort: Seidenstrumpf, Die größten Spioninnen des 19. und 20. Jahrhunderts. ars vivendi verlag, 2010,  (German)
 Ostrovsky, Erika. (1978), Eye of Dawn: The Rise and Fall of Mata Hari. New York: Macmillan.  
 Samuels, Diane: The true life fiction of Mata Hari. Hern Books, London 2002, 
 Shipman, Pat. (2007), Femme Fatale: Love, Lies, and the Unknown Life of Mata Hari. London: Weidenfeld & Nicolson 
 Waagenaar, Sam. (1965), Mata Hari. New York: Appleton-Century.
 Wheelwright, Julie. (1992). The Fatal Lover: Mata Hari and the Myth of Women in Espionage. London: Collins and Brown. 
 Mauro Macedonio. (2017). Mata Hari, a life through images. Tricase: Youcanprint.

External links

 Multi-language (nl, fr, de, en) website on Mata Hari
 Details of the disappearance of the corpse
 "The Execution of Mata Hari, 1917," EyeWitness to History, www.eyewitnesstohistory.com (2005)
 "Mata Hari," from History Magazine. Complete text, images, video

1876 births
1917 deaths
Civilians who were court-martialed
Double agents
Dutch courtesans
Dutch female dancers
Dutch female erotic dancers
Dutch people executed abroad
Dutch people of World War I
Executed Dutch women
Executed spies
Female wartime spies
People executed by France by firing squad
People executed by the French Third Republic
People from Leeuwarden
Women in World War I
World War I espionage
World War I spies for France
World War I spies for Germany